The Bartlett Ministry was a Ministry of the Government of Tasmania, and was led by Labor Premier David Bartlett and his deputy Lara Giddings. It succeeded the Lennon Ministry on 26 May 2008 due to the departure of Paul Lennon from politics. Following the 2010 state election, which reduced Labor to minority government, an agreement was formed with the Tasmanian Greens who held two cabinet positions. The Bartlett Ministry was dissolved on 23 January 2011 and was succeeded by the Giddings Ministry, after Bartlett resigned as Premier,

First Ministry

Second Ministry
The second Bartlett Ministry was formed on 21 April 2010, and contained two members of the Tasmanian Greens.

Third Ministry
The third Bartlett Ministry was formed on 11 November 2010, and contained two members of the Tasmanian Greens.

Notes

References
 Hansard Indexes for 2008 and 2009, "Legislature of Tasmania"
 AAP "Tas: David Bartlett's cabinet", 21 April 2010

Tasmanian ministries
Australian Labor Party ministries in Tasmania